Ian Dominick Fernow is an American experimental musician, poet and multimedia artist. He is best known for extreme music released under the stage name Prurient, as well as numerous other aliases including Vatican Shadow and Rainforest Spiritual Enslavement. His first releases date back to 1998, the same year in which he founded the record label Hospital Productions.

Life 

Fernow was born into a Roman Catholic household, and was raised in Madison, Wisconsin. He recounts his entrance into public school and his exposure to death metal and tape trading as early sources of musical interest. In particular, Fernow cites the death metal band Deicide's album Once upon the Cross as, "frightening ... A huge record for me, still to this day."

Fernow has resided in Providence, New York City, Los Angeles, and Berlin, and runs the labels Hospital Productions and Bed of Nails.

Career

In his early work as Prurient, Fernow worked primarily with a microphone and amplifier, and sometimes drums. He eventually began utilizing more electronics, and currently works primarily with laptop and synthesizers. In the past, he collaborated with artists like John Wiese, Jeff Plummer (of Immaculate:Grotesque and Shallow Waters), Kris Lapke (of Alberich and MCMS), Wolf Eyes, Macronympha, and Philip Best (of Whitehouse and Consumer Electronics).

Fernow has also performed in various bands, such as Football Rabbit, Vegas Martyrs, Taylor Bow, Ash Pool, and formerly as part of Cold Cave. Prurient has released material on numerous independent record labels, such as Hanson Records, RRRecords, Load Records, Troubleman Unlimited, Chrondritic Sound, Kitty Play Records, American Tapes, and his own label Hospital Productions. Fernow has also recorded music under a variety of aliases, including Vatican Shadow, Rainforest Spiritual Enslavement, Exploring Jezebel, River Magic, Winter Soldier, Window Cleaning By Ian, December Magic, and Tortured Hooker.

Prurient has been covered in outlets such as The New Yorker, Pitchfork Media, The Village Voice, and Resident Advisor.

Partial discography

As Prurient

As Vatican Shadow

Studio albums

EPs and singles

Compilations

As Rainforest Spiritual Enslavement

Studio albums

Papua Land Where Spirits Still Rule (2012)
Folklore Venom (2013)
Green Graves (2016)
Ambient Black Magic (2017)

EPs
The Plant with Many Faces (2013)
Black Magic Cannot Cross Water (2013)
Water Rose Above the Head (2013)

Compilations
Water Witches (2017)

As Christian Cosmos

Studio albums
Enthronement by God as the First-Born of the Dead (2012)

EPs
Cadence upon the Threshold of Judgement (2012)
The Sharp Lines That Delineate His Robes (2012)
Which Echo Again and Again (2012)

As Exploring Jezebel

Studio albums
On a Business Trip to London (2015)

As a Contributor/Guest Artist

References

External links 

 [ Prurient] on AllMusic
 Prurient discography on RateYourMusic
 Prurient discography on Discogs

Living people
American electronic musicians
American noise musicians
American industrial musicians
Musicians from Wisconsin
Load Records artists
Dais Records artists
1981 births
Profound Lore Records artists
Power electronics musicians
American techno musicians